The pouched lamprey (Geotria australis), also known as the korokoro or wide-mouthed lamprey, is a species in the genus Geotria, which is the only genus in the family Geotriidae. The second species in the genus is the Argentinian lamprey (Geotria macrostoma), which was revalidated as a separate species in 2020. The pouched lamprey is native to the southern hemisphere. It spends the early part of its life in fresh water, migrating to the sea as an adult, and returning to fresh water to spawn and die.

Description

It has two low dorsal fins on the back half. Like other lampreys, it has no jaws, only a sucker. The skin is a striking silver in adult lampreys caught fresh from the sea but soon changes to brown after they have been in fresh water for some time, due to deposition of biliverdin. Adult eyes are relatively small and located on the side of the head. When fully mature, males develop a baggy pouch under their eyes, which may be used to massage and oxygenate its eggs. There have also been suggestions that the pouch in northern hemisphere species has been used by males during breeding times for gathering stones to make a nest.

Life cycle 
The freshwater ammocoete or larval stage of the life cycle are a dull brown in colour for most of their lives. Ammocoetes remain in fresh water for about four years until undergoing a six-month metamorphosis, changing to silver with blue-green stripes. The central nervous system of the pouched lamprey develops notably during metamorphosis to the large-eyed macropthalmia stage, with particularly large increases in the volume of visual areas of the brain. At this point they migrate downstream to the sea.

Adults spend some of their life in the open sea, living as a parasite on other fish. They attach themselves to the gills or side of the fish and rasp at the tissues below. Adults return to fresh water to breed, spending up to eighteen months sexually maturing before spawning. Adults have been recorded living up to 105 days after spawning and wrapping themselves around egg masses to provide parental care.

Distribution and habitat
The pouched lamprey is widespread in the Southern Hemisphere, occurring in New Zealand, Chile, Argentina, the Falkland Islands, South Georgia and the southwest and southeast corners of Australia.

Threats 
Lampreys are preyed on by albatrosses, shags, large fish and marine mammals. It has been hypothesised that the apparent decline in lamprey numbers could be caused by the degradation of water quality in lowland waterways.

References

External links

 New Zealand lamprey discussed on RadioNZ Critter of the Week, 12 February 2016

pouched lamprey
Fish families

pouched lamprey
pouched lamprey